This is a list of Chinese national-type primary schools (SJK(C)) in Perlis, Malaysia. As of June 2022, there are 10 Chinese primary schools with a total of 1,810 students.

List of Chinese national-type primary schools in Perlis

See also
Lists of Chinese national-type primary schools in Malaysia

Footnotes

References

 
Schools in Perlis
Perlis
Chinese-language schools in Malaysia